The 2010 Manitoba Scotties Tournament of Hearts, Manitoba's provincial women's curling championship, was held January 6–10 in Killarney, Manitoba. The winning Jill Thurston rink represented team Manitoba at the 2010 Scotties Tournament of Hearts in Sault Ste. Marie, Ontario.

Teams

Black Group

Red Group

Standings

Black Group

Red Group

Results

Draw 1
January 6, 8:30 AM

Draw 2
January  6, 12:15 PM

Draw 3
January 6, 4:00 PM

Draw 4
January 6, 8:15 PM

Draw 5
January 7, 8:30 AM

Draw 6
January 7, 12:15 PM

Draw 7
January 7, 4:00 PM

Draw 8
January 7, 7:45 PM

Draw 9
January 8, 8:30 AM

Draw 10
January 8, 12:15 PM

Draw 11
January 8, 4:00 PM

Draw 12
January 8, 7:45 PM

Draw 13
January 9, 8:30 AM

Draw 14
January 9, 12:15 PM

Playoffs

R1 vs. B1
January 9, 7:00 PM

R2 vs. B2
January 9, 7:00 PM

Semifinal
January 10, 9:30 AM

Final
January 10, 1:30 PM

References

External links
Official site
Manitoba Curling Association

Manitoba
Municipality of Killarney-Turtle Mountain
Scotties Tournament of Hearts
Curling in Manitoba
Manitoba Scotties Tournament of Hearts